Barbara von Wertheim (1500-1561) was a countess of Wertheim by marriage to count George II von Wertheim. She was the regent of the County of Wertheim and the Lordhship of Breuberg during the minority of her son count Michael III of Wertheim between 1531 and 1547. She is known for her work to introduce the Reformation in her domain during her reign.

References

 Joseph Aschbach: Geschichte der Grafen von Wertheim von den ältesten Zeiten bis zu ihrem Erlöschen im Mannsstamm im Jahre 1556. Zweiter Teil. Wertheimisches Urkundenbuch. Mit zwölf Wappen- und Siegeltafeln. Frankfurt am Main 1843

16th-century women rulers
1561 deaths
People of the Protestant Reformation